The Upper Gash Subregion is a subregion in the Gash-Barka region (Zoba Gash-Barka) of western Eritrea.

References

Subregions of Eritrea

Subregions of Eritrea